The Habo Mission Covenant Church is a church building in Habo, Sweden. Belonging to both the Uniting Church in Sweden and the Swedish Alliance Mission. the current church building was opened in March 1983.

References

External links

official website 

20th-century churches in Sweden
Churches in Habo Municipality
Habo
Churches completed in 1983
Swedish Alliance Mission churches
Uniting Church in Sweden churches